Paul Francis Gray (28 November 1963 – 24 April 2018) was an Australian songwriter, pianist, singer and record producer. He met with early success as the lead vocalist for the 1980s funk/pop band Wa Wa Nee.

After the disbanding of Wa Wa Nee, Gray concentrated on work as a keyboard player, musical director, songwriter and producer. He worked with many highly successful Australian artists, including Tina Arena, Kate Ceberano and Bardot.

Gray appeared in the Countdown Spectacular 2 concert series in Australia between late August and early September 2007 as a performer and musical director. He sang two songs: "Stimulation" and "Sugar Free". In 2012, Gray appeared on an episode of Myf Warhurst’s Nice, singing a duet of "Islands in the Stream" with Warhurst.

Death
Gray was diagnosed with multiple myeloma, a form of cancer, in 2014, and died from the disease on 24 April 2018, at age 54. The news was announced by his brother and fellow band member, Mark.

Selective discography
1986 Wa Wa Nee, Wa Wa Nee – Paul Gray: vocals, keyboards, songwriting
1989 Wa Wa Nee, Blush – Paul Gray: vocals, keyboards, songwriting
1994 Kate Ceberano, Kate Ceberano and Friends – Paul Gray: keyboards, producer
2000 Bardot, Bardot – Paul Gray: programmer, producer
2001 Scandal'us, Startin' Somethin''' – Paul Gray: producer
2003 Tina Arena, Vous Êtes Toujours Là – Paul Gray: musical director, keyboards
2004 Trentwood, Autotunes – Paul Gray: keyboards, backing vocals
2005 Anthony Callea, "Per Sempre"
2005 Tina Arena, Greatest Hits Live'' – Paul Gray: musical director, keyboards
He appears on three compilations and one video.

References

1963 births
2018 deaths
Deaths from multiple myeloma
Australian pianists
Australian pop singers
Australian rock singers
Australian rock keyboardists
Australian singer-songwriters
Deaths from cancer in New South Wales
Keytarists
Male pianists
Australian male singer-songwriters